is a railway station in the city of  Gamagōri, Aichi Prefecture, Japan, operated by Central Japan Railway Company (JR Tōkai).

Lines
Mikawa-Ōtsuka Station is served by the Tōkaidō Main Line, and is located 305.2 kilometers from the starting point of the line at Tokyo Station.

Station layout
The station has two opposed side platforms connected to the elevated station building by a footbridge. The station building has automated ticket machines, TOICA automated turnstiles and is unattended.

Platforms

Adjacent stations

|-
!colspan=5|Central Japan Railway Company

Station history
Mikawa-Ōtsuka Station was opened on July 28, 1953 as a station of the JNR (Japan National Railway), however, its station building was not completed until June 24, 1954. The platforms were lengthened, and a new station building was completed on August 6, 1965. With the dissolution and privatization of the JNR on April 1, 1987, the station came under the control of the Central Japan Railway Company. A new station building was completed on July 20, 2005.

Station numbering was introduced to the section of the Tōkaidō Line operated JR Central in March 2018; Mikawa-Ōtsuka Station was assigned station number CA45.

Passenger statistics
In fiscal 2017, the station was used by an average of 1266 passengers daily (boarding passengers only).

Surrounding area
 Ōtsuka Elementary School
 Ōtsuka Junior High School
Japan National Route 23
 Gamagōri Higashi High School

See also
 List of Railway Stations in Japan

References

Yoshikawa, Fumio. Tokaido-sen 130-nen no ayumi. Grand-Prix Publishing (2002) .

External links

Railway stations in Japan opened in 1953
Railway stations in Aichi Prefecture
Tōkaidō Main Line
Stations of Central Japan Railway Company
Gamagōri, Aichi